The Kuwait Red Crescent Society is a branch of the international Red Crescent Society. It was established on January 10, 1966.

Founders

 Dr. Ibrahim Muhalhal Al Yassin 
 Barges Humoud AL Barges 
 The late Khalid Youssef Al Muttawaa 
 Saad Ali Al Nahedh 
 The late Sulaiman Khalid Al Muttawaa 
 Dr. Abdulrahman Abdullah Al Awadi 
 Abdullrahman Salem Al Attiqi 
 The late Dr. Abdullrazaq Al Adwani 
 Abdulaziz Hamad Al Sager

 Abdulaziz Mohamed Al Shayaa 
 The late Abdullah Al Sultan Al Kuklaib 
 Abdullah Ali AL Muttawaa 
 Abdulmohsen Sauood Al Zabin 
 Ali Mohamed Al Radhwan 
 The late Mohamed Youssef Al Nissif 
 Youssef Ibrahim Al Ghanem 
 Youssef Jassem Al Haji 
 Youssef Abdulaziz Al Fulaij

History 

The society was formally founded in 1966.

In 2014, the Kuwait Red Crescent Society sent aid, including medical and food supplies, to Gaza.

References

External links
 Official website

Red Cross and Red Crescent national societies
1966 establishments in Kuwait
Organizations established in 1966
Medical and health organizations based in Kuwait